The Forcipulatacea are a superorder of sea stars.

Subdivision 
 order Forcipulatida
 order Brisingida
 incertae sedis:
 family Paulasteriidae

References 

 
Asteroidea